Crockett High School, also known as the Crockett Vocational/Technical Center, was a senior high school operated during 1994-2012 by Detroit Public Schools and located in Detroit.

Crockett occupied the former Burroughs Middle School. The building first opened in 1924. It received a $3.5 million bond investment prior to its 2012 closure. It merged with Finney High School to form the newly constructed East English Village High School.

References

External links
 Crockett High School (Archive)

Public high schools in Michigan
High schools in Detroit
2012 disestablishments in Michigan
Educational institutions disestablished in 2012
Crockett High School (Michigan) alumni
1994 establishments in Michigan
Detroit Public Schools Community District
School buildings completed in 1924
Educational institutions established in 1994